Parmentiera cereifera, the candle tree, is a species of tree in the family Bignoniaceae. It is endemic to Panama, but it is also a commonly cultivated specimen in botanical gardens.

This tree grows up to 6 meters tall. The oppositely-arranged leaves are each made up of three leaflets. They are borne on winged petioles up to 5 centimeters long. The flower is solitary or borne in a cluster of up to four. The five-lobed corolla is greenish white. The fruit is a taper-shaped berry up to 60 centimeters long. It is green, ripening yellow, and waxy in texture. The fleshy fruit is edible.

References

https://biofertilize.com/candle-tree-1357911united-states/

External links

cereifera
Endemic flora of Panama

https://biofertilize.com/candle-tree-1357911united-states/